Kabbe was a constituency in the Zambezi Region of Namibia. Most of the area is situated in the flood area of the Zambezi River. It contained the former German colonial residence of Schuckmannsburg (today Luhonono), as well as several other villages. Its population in 2010 was 14,979.

In August 2013, Kabbe Constituency was split into Kabbe South and Kabbe North.

Politics
In the 2004 presidential election,  Kabbe voted overwhelmingly for Hifikepunye Pohamba of Swapo party. Pohamba won with 3764 (96%) votes, with Ben Ulenga of the Congress of Democrats receiving 82 (2%) of the Constituency's votes.

References

Constituencies of Zambezi Region